The Applicability of Mathematics in Science: Indispensability and Ontology is a 2012 book on the philosophy of mathematics by Sorin Bangu. It argues for an improved form of indispensability argument based on a Quinean-inspired naturalism and confirmational holism, as well as a position he calls "posit realism". It also explores the applications of mathematics in scientific discovery and explanation.

References 

Mathematics books
Books about philosophy of mathematics